Raya Abirached (born 12 May 1977) is a Lebanese TV presenter and celebrity journalist at MBC.

She is best known for co-hosting the hit TV talent show, Arabs Got Talent.  She also hosts Scoop with Raya, a show  which provides news and interviews with Hollywood actors and directors, and has been referred to as "the Arab version of E!"

Biography
Raya started her career as a print and broadcast journalist for Radio du Mont Liban (RML) and MTV in Beirut before moving to the UK in 1999. She holds a Bachelor of Arts degree in economics, a Masters in Cinema, and a Masters in Broadcast Journalism from the University of Westminster. She is fluent in Arabic, English, French and Italian.

Career
Raya has interviewed movie stars and directors including: Tom Cruise, Angelina Jolie, George Clooney, Brad Pitt, Clint Eastwood, Martin Scorsese, Julia Roberts and Natalie Portman. She has also interviewed Mariah Carey, Beyoncé and Shakira, among others; as well as sporting icons Luís Figo and Boris Becker.

Raya previously hosted the weekly business show "World Business", which aired on CNBC Europe and Asia, PBS in America and Al Arabiya in the Arab world. She also hosted events like the American Idol competition in Dubai as well as the launch of Ferrari World Abu Dhabi.

Raya also regularly collaborates as a celebrity journalist with several TV stations like Entertainment Tonight in the US, Star TV in Switzerland, ZDF in Germany, ORF in Austria and Telecine in Brazil and is often requested to do generic interviews for major movie studios like Warner Bros., Disney and Paramount.

Her Facebook page has more than 3 million followers, her Instagram over 5 million followers, and according to Forbes, she ranks 92 among the top 100 Arab celebrities.

Personal life
In 2011, Raya married an Italian businessman, Valerio Cammarano, with whom she has one daughter, Lola, born in 2016.

Filmography

Television

References

External links 
Arab's Got Talent

1977 births
Living people
Lebanese television presenters
British television presenters
British women journalists
British women television presenters
British people of Lebanese descent
Actresses from Beirut
Alumni of the University of Westminster
Lebanese Christians
Lebanese women journalists
Lebanese women television presenters